Années de pèlerinage (French for Years of Pilgrimage) (S.160, S.161, S.162, S.163) is a set of three suites for solo piano by Franz Liszt. Much of it derives from his earlier work, Album d'un voyageur, his first major published piano cycle, which was composed between 1835 and 1838 and published in 1842. Années de pèlerinage is widely considered as the masterwork and summation of Liszt's musical style. The third volume is notable as an example of his later style. Composed well after the first two volumes, it displays less virtuosity and more harmonic experimentation.

The title Années de pèlerinage refers to Goethe's famous novel of self-realization, Wilhelm Meister's Apprenticeship, and especially its sequel Wilhelm Meister's Journeyman Years (whose original title Wilhelm Meisters Wanderjahre meant Years of Wandering or Years of Pilgrimage, the latter being used for its first French translation). Liszt clearly places these compositions in line with the Romantic literature of his time, prefacing most pieces with a literary passage from writers such as Schiller, Byron or Senancour, and, in an introduction to the entire work, writing:

The suites

Première année: Suisse

"Première année: Suisse" ("First Year: Switzerland"), S.160, was published in 1855. Composed between 1848 and 1854, most of the pieces  (Nos. 1, 2, 3, 4, 6, 8 and 9) are revisions of Album d'un voyageur: Part 1: Impressions et Poesies. "Au lac de Wallenstadt" (No. 2) and "Au bord d'une source" (No. 4) received only minor revisions, while "La Chapelle de Guillaume Tell" (No. 1), "Vallée d'Obermann" (No. 6), and especially "Les cloches de Genève" (No. 9) were more extensively rewritten. "Églogue" (No. 7) was published separately, and "Orage" (No. 5) was included as part of the definitive version of the cycle.

 Chapelle de Guillaume Tell (William Tell's Chapel) in C major – For this depiction of the Swiss struggle for liberation Liszt chooses a motto from Schiller as caption, "All for one – one for all." A noble passage marked lento opens the piece, followed by the main melody of the freedom fighters. A horn call rouses the troops, echoes down the valleys, and mixes with the sound of the heroic struggle.
 Au lac de Wallenstadt (At Lake Wallenstadt) in A major – Liszt's caption is from Lord Byron's Childe Harold's Pilgrimage (Canto III, stanza 85): "Thy contrasted lake / With the wild world I dwell in is a thing / Which warns me, with its stillness, to forsake / Earth's troubled waters for a purer spring." In her Mémoires, Liszt's mistress and traveling companion of the time, Marie d'Agoult, recalls their time by Lake Wallenstadt, writing, "Franz wrote for me there a melancholy harmony, imitative of the sigh of the waves and the cadence of oars, which I have never been able to hear without weeping."
 Pastorale in E major – 
 Au bord d'une source (Beside a Spring) in A major – Liszt's caption is from Schiller: “In the whispering coolness begins young nature’s play.”
 Orage (Storm) in C minor – Liszt's caption is again from Byron's Childe Harold's Pilgrimage (Canto III, canto 96): "But where of ye, O tempests! is the goal? / Are ye like those within the human breast? / Or do ye find, at length, like eagles, some high nest?"
 Vallée d'Obermann (Obermann's Valley) in E minor – Inspired by Étienne Pivert de Senancour's novel of the same title, set in Switzerland, with a hero overwhelmed and confused by nature, suffering from ennui and longing, finally concluding that only our feelings are true. The captions include one from Byron's succeeding canto 97, ("Could I embody and unbosom now / That which is most within me,--could I wreak / My thoughts upon expression, and thus throw / Soul--heart--mind--passions--feelings--strong or weak-- / All that I would have sought, and all I seek, / Bear, know, feel--and yet breathe--into one word, / And that one word were Lightning, I would speak; / But as it is, I live and die unheard, / With a most voiceless thought, sheathing it as a sword")  and two from Senancour's Obermann, which include the crucial questions, “What do I want? Who am I? What do I ask of nature?"
 Eglogue (Eclogue) in A major – Liszt's caption is from the next canto of the Pilgrimage: "The morn is up again, the dewy morn, / With breath all incense, and with cheek all bloom, / Laughing the clouds away with playful scorn, / And living as if earth contained no tomb!" 
 Le mal du pays (Homesickness) in E minor – 
 Les cloches de Genève: Nocturne (The Bells of Geneva: Nocturne) in B major – Liszt's caption is from stanza 72, earlier in the Byron's Pilgrimage: “I live not in myself, but I become / Portion of that around me”.

Deuxième année: Italie

"Deuxième année: Italie" ("Second Year: Italy"), S.161, was composed between 1837 and 1849 and published in 1858 by Schott. Nos. 4 to 6 are revisions of Tre sonetti del Petrarca (Three sonnets of Petrarch), which was composed around 1839–1846 and published in 1846.
 Sposalizio (Marriage of the Virgin, a painting by Raphael) in E major
 Il penseroso (The Thinker, a statue by Michelangelo) in C minor
 Canzonetta del Salvator Rosa (Canzonetta of Salvator Rosa) in A major (Note: this song "Vado ben spesso cangiando loco" was in fact written by Giovanni Bononcini)
 Sonetto 47 del Petrarca (Petrarch's Sonnet 47) in D major
 Sonetto 104 del Petrarca (Petrarch's Sonnet 104) in E major
 Sonetto 123 del Petrarca (Petrarch's Sonnet 123) in A major
 Après une lecture de Dante: Fantasia Quasi Sonata (After Reading Dante: Fantasia Quasi Sonata) in D minor 
 Venezia e Napoli (Venice and Naples), S.162. Composed in 1859 as a partial revision of an earlier set with the same name composed around 1840. Published in 1861 as a supplement to the Second Year
 Gondoliera (Gondolier's Song) in F major – Based on the song "La biondina in gondoletta" by Giovanni Battista Peruchini.
 Canzone (Canzone) in E minor – Based on the gondolier's song "Nessun maggior dolore" from Rossini's Otello.
 Tarantella (Tarantella) in G minor – Uses themes by Guillaume-Louis Cottrau, 1797–1847.

Troisième année

"Troisième année" ("Third Year"), S.163, was published 1883; Nos. 1–4 and 7 composed in 1877; No. 5, 1872; No. 6, 1867.
 Angélus! Prière aux anges gardiens (Angelus! Prayer to the Guardian Angels) in E major – dedicated to Daniela von Bülow, Liszt's granddaughter, first daughter of Hans von Bülow and Cosima Liszt and wife of art historian Henry Thode.  It was written for both melodeon, piano, or an instrument that combines both, for Liszt wrote "piano-melodium" on his manuscript
 Aux cyprès de la Villa d'Este I:  Thrénodie (To the Cypresses of the Villa d'Este I: Threnody) in G minor
 Aux cyprès de la Villa d'Este II: Thrénodie (To the Cypresses of the Villa d'Este II: Threnody) in E minor – The Villa d'Este  described in these two threnodies is in Tivoli, near Rome.  It is famous for its beautiful cypresses and fountains
 Les jeux d'eaux à la Villa d'Este (The Fountains of the Villa d'Este) in F major – Over the music, Liszt placed the inscription, "Sed aqua quam ego dabo ei, fiet in eo fons aquae salientis in vitam aeternam" ("But the water that I shall give him shall become in him a well of water springing up into eternal life," from the Gospel of John). This piece, with its advanced harmonies and shimmering textures, is in many ways a precursor of musical Impressionism 
 Sunt lacrymae rerum/En mode hongrois (There are Tears for Things/In Hungarian Style) in A minor – Dedicated to Hans von Bülow.
 Marche funèbre, En mémoire de Maximilian I, Empereur du Mexique (Funeral March, In memory of Emperor Maximilian of Mexico) in F minor
 Sursum corda (Lift Up Your Hearts) in E major

Recordings
There have been numerous recordings made of the suites, in both complete and incomplete form.

Video
Alfred Brendel (Deutsche Grammophon) DVD

Score
Edition Peters publishes the complete score, with the first volume of the trilogy "Suisse" published together with the "Trois Morceaux suisses" for the first time, in line with the composer’s original intention to combine all his Swiss-inspired character pieces into a single volume. The musical journey is supported by the inclusion of historical illustrations of the scenes and landscapes that inspired the composer. Edited by world-renowned Liszt expert and concert pianist Leslie Howard, the edition also contains Liszt’s original fingerings.

Dover Publications has issued a complete edition in one bound volume. Also included is an appendix of related works including Lyon (from the first book of Album d'un voyageur), Apparitions, Tre sonetti del Petrarca, and the original version of Venezia e Napoli.

In literature
Haruki Murakami's novel Colorless Tsukuru Tazaki and His Years of Pilgrimage (2013) centers on the movement "Le Mal du pays," and derives its title from the Années.

References

External links
 
Performance of Première année: Suisse by Cecile Licad from the Isabella Stewart Gardner Museum in MP3 format

Compositions by Franz Liszt
Compositions for solo piano
1849 compositions
1854 compositions
1867 compositions
1872 compositions
1877 compositions
Suites (music)